Events from the year 1860 in China.

Incumbents 
 Xianfeng Emperor (10th year)

Events 
 Nian Rebellion
 Second Opium War
 Battle of Palikao
 Battle of Zhangjiawan
 August 1 — Allied fleet lands at Beitang.
 August 22 — Battle of Taku Forts (1860), British and French forces capture Taku forts in north China.
 September 22 — The Xianfeng emperor abandons the capital.
 October 13 — British and French troops occupy Beijing.
 October 18 Destruction of the Old Summer Palace
 October 24 Sino-British Treaty of Beijing signed.
 Taiping Rebellion
 Battle of Jiangnan (1860)
 June 2 — Taiping forces under the Loyal King capture Suzhou
 Taiping forces defeat a Qing army surrounding Tianjing, breaking the siege
 June–September — Battle of Anqing, Qing forces capture Anqing
 May — Taiping armies rout imperial siege troops at Nanjing.
 Issachar Roberts arrives in Nanjing.
 Frederick Townsend Ward enlists foreigners for rifle corps in Shanghai.
 Zeng Guofan appointed acting Viceroy of Liangjiang, Jiangxi, Anhui, and Jiangsu; receives full appointment on August 10.
 July 15 — The Loyal King sends letter stating that the Taiping won't harm foreigners at Shanghai.
 July 16 — Frederick Townsend Ward's militia captures Songjiang
 July 28 — Zeng Guofan sets up headquarters in Qimen.
 July 30 — Taiping forces defeat Frederick Townsend Ward at Qingpu.
 August 2 — Joseph Edkins and Griffith John arrive in Suzhou to meet Hong Rengan.
 August 19 — British and French forces attack Taiping rebels at Shanghai.
 Miao Rebellion (1854–73)
 Convention of Peking
 Amur Annexation, the annexation of the current southeast corner of Siberia into Russia in 1858–1860
 Panthay Rebellion
 Approximate beginning of the Tongzhi Restoration

Births 

 Zhu Jiabao
 Gu Zhongchen
 Zheng Xiaoxu

Deaths 

 Lam Qua, painter who specialized in Western-style portraits intended largely for Western clients
 Luo Zundian, Qing commander who was forced to commit suicide after losing 
 Zhang Guoliang, Qing commander drowned trying to escape in the Jiangnan campaign

References